David Buckley (born October 2001) is an Irish Gaelic footballer who plays at club level with Newcetsown and at inter-county level with the Cork senior football team. He usually lines out as a forward.

Career

Buckley first came to prominence as a dual player at juvenile and underage levels with the Newcestown club. He was part of the Newcestown minor teams that claimed a minor double in 2019, while also making his senior team debut that year. Buckley first appeared on the inter-county scene as a member of the Cork minor football team in 2018. He later won a Munster Championship title with the under-20 side. Buckley was first selected for the Cork senior football team for the pre-season McGrath Cup competition in 2022. He later earned inclusion on the team's National League panel.

Career statistics

Honours

Cork
Munster Under-20 Football Championship: 2021

References

2001 births
Living people
MTU Cork Gaelic footballers
Newcestown Gaelic footballers
Newcestown hurlers
Cork inter-county Gaelic footballers